

History
In the mid-1970s, the Florida Department of Transportation (formerly the State Road Department) started a sequence of events that eventually resulted in the transferral of hundred of miles of roadway from State of Florida maintenance to county control. The first step was the addition of an "S-" or "C-" prefix onto the original FDOT designation ("S" represented "secondary"; "C" represented "county").

In 1977, House Bill 803, Chapter 77-165 in the Laws of Florida, was passed in the Florida Legislature. This transportation policy act eliminated the State Highway Secondary System which consisted of county roads that were maintained by the state. The provisions went into effect on July 1, 1977.

State Road signs started disappearing from the "C" roads and were replaced by Manual on Uniform Traffic Control Devices (MUTCD) compliant county road signs in the early 1980s; the transition of "S" roads to county control took a bit longer. Many roads that were decommissioned in later years skipped the prefix step.

The following is a list of former state roads in Florida:

1–99

 State Road 4A
 State Road 4B
 State Road 5A (now County Road 5A) – Old Dixie Highway from near Wabasso Road (SR 510) in Wabasso to the former SR 605 in Vero Beach
 State Road 5A (now County Road 5A): Flagler Street from First Street to South Roosevelt Boulevard (SR A1A) in Key West.  Commercially prepared road maps still indicate incorrectly that CR 5A is still a State Road (when it was, it was not signed as such). Some maps even suggest that it includes White Street between US 1 and Flagler Street.
 State Road 14A
 State Road 15A and 15B (now County Road 15A and 15B) – two short roads connecting US 98-441 (SR 15-700) and SR 710 near Up the Grove Beach
 State Road 15C (now County Road 15C) – a spur from SR 15 near Fort Drum
 State Road 16A
 State Road 17A
 State Road A19A
 State Road 20A
 State Road 20B
 State Road 21A
 State Road 21B
 State Road 21C
 State Road 21D
 State Road 23A
 State Road 23B
 State Road 23C
 State Road 23D
 State Road 23E
 State Road 23F
 State Road 25B
 State Road 29A
 State Road 30A
 State Road 30B
 State Road 30C
 State Road 30D
 State Road 30E
 State Road 30F
 State Road 30G
 State Road 30H
 State Road 30J
 State Road 35A
 State Road 35B
 State Road 39A
 State Road 39B
 State Road 48 originally ran from Floral City to Howey-in-the-Hills, but was truncated to Interstate 75 and US Route 301 in Bushnell. In 2016, the last state section of the road was turned over to Sumter County.
 State Road 64A (part now 636)
 State Road 69A
 State Road 71A
 State Road 73A
 State Road 73B
 State Road 77A
 State Road 77B
 State Road 77C
 State Road 78A - now County Road 78A
 State Road 78B
 State Road 80A
 State Road 81A
 State Road 95A
 State Road 97A
 State Road 100A
 State Road 100B

101–200
 State Road 101A
 State Road 105A (now County Road 105A (Nassau County, Florida))
 State Road 106 
 State Road 106A 
 State Road 106B
 State Road 110
 State Road 115B
 State Road 115C
 State Road 119
 State Road 121A
 State Road 124
 State Road 125
 State Road 127
 State Road 130
 State Road 131 (now County Road 131 (Columbia County, Florida))
 State Road 132 (now County Road 132 (Suwannee County, Florida))
 State Road 132A 
 State Road 133
 State Road 133A
 State Road 133B
 State Road 133C
 State Road 135 (now County Road 135 (Hamilton County, Florida))
 State Road 137 (now County Road 137 (Suwannee County, Florida) and County Road 137 (Hamilton County, Florida))
 State Road 137A
 State Road 138
 State Road 139A
 State Road 139B
 State Road 141 (now Madison County Road 141 and Hamilton County Road 141 ) - Ran from US 90 in Twin Rivers State Forest to the Florida-Georgia Line north of Jennings
 State Road 142- SR 151 in Felkel to US 19 in Monticello- now County Road 142
 State Road 144- now County Road 346
 State Road 146- SR 146 in Tallahassee to Miccosukee- now County Road 146
 State Road 148
 State Road 149
 State Road 150 (now County Road 150) – two sections: one from US 19/US 27 in rural Madison County to US 221 in Greenville; another from US 90 east of Greenville to former SR 152 in Hamilton County.
 State Road 151- Tallahassee to Georgia- now County Road 151
 State Road 152 (now County Road 152) –  ran from the Former State Road 150 bridge over the Withlacoochee River in Belville, to US 41 southeast of Jennings.
 State Road 153
 State Road 157A
 State Road 158- SR 155 to SR 263- now County Road 158
 State Road 159A
 State Road 160
 State Road 161
 State Road 161A
 State Road 162
 State Road 163
 State Road 164
 State Road 164A
 State Road 164B
 State Road 165
 State Road 167 (now County Road 2301 and County Road 167) – two sections: one from US 231 in Bayou George north of Panama City to SR 20 west of Fountain, now CR 2301; another from US 231 in Betts through the northwest corner of Calhoun County then into Jackson County where it eventually joins SR 267 south of Marianna. After I-10, the road branches off to South Street and runs east until joining SR 73, where it turns north until the intersection with US 90. Here SR 73 turns west, and CR 167 joins SR 166, until it turns onto "Old US Road" and runs north toward the Alabama State Line.
 State Road 168
 State Road 169
 State Road 171
 State Road 172
 State Road 175
 State Road 176
 State Road 177
 State Road 177A
 State Road 179
 State Road 179A
 State Road 181
 State Road 181A
 State Road 182
 State Road 183
 State Road 183A
 State Road 184
 State Road 185
 State Road 186
 State Road 193
 State Road 194
 State Road 195
 State Road 200A

201-300
 State Road 201
 State Road 203
 State Road 205
 State Road 209
 State Road 209A
 State Road 209B
 State Road 213
 State Road 214
 State Road 215
 State Road 217
 State Road 218
 State Road 219
 State Road 219A
 State Road 220
 State Road 220A
 State Road 220B
 State Road 224
 State Road 224A
 State Road 224B
 State Road 225
 State Road 225A
 State Road 227
 State Road 229
 State Road 232
 State Road 233
 State Road 234
 State Road 235A
 State Road 236
 State Road 237
 State Road 239
 State Road 240
 State Road 241
 State Road 242
 State Road 245
 State Road 245A
 State Road 246
 State Road 250
 State Road 250A
 State Road 252
 State Road 252A
 State Road 252B
 State Road 256
 State Road 259 (now Leon County Road 259 and Jefferson County Road 259) - also known as "The Old Tram Road," Tram Road, Limestone Road, Wacissa Highway, and Waukeenah Highway, is a bi-county route that serves southeastern Leon County and western Jefferson County, Florida. The western terminus is an intersection with Monroe Street (SR 61) in Tallahassee; the northern terminus is an intersection with US 19 (SR 57) in Monticello. Communities served along its route also include Corey, Cody, Limestone, Wacissa, Thomas City, Waukeenah, and Casa Blanco. Leon County Road 259 is signed east–west, while Jefferson County Road 259 is signed east–west on Tram Road and Paradise Road, and signed north–south between SR 59 and the northern terminus.
 State Road 260- now Leon County Road 260
 State Road 263A
 State Road 264
 State Road 267A
 State Road 268
 State Road 268A
 State Road 269
 State Road 269A
 State Road 269B
 State Road 270
 State Road 270A
 State Road 271
 State Road 272
 State Road 274
 State Road 275
 State Road 275A
 State Road 275B
 State Road 276A
 State Road 278
 State Road 280
 State Road 280A
 State Road 286
 State Road 287
 State Road 287A
 State Road 289A
 State Road 292A
 State Road 295A
 State Road 296A
 State Road 297A
 State Road 298A
 State Road 299

301–400
 State Road 302
 State Road 303
 State Road 304
 State Road 305
 State Road 307
 State Road 313, now coming back and being built from SR-207 at the intersection with SR-312 to SR-16 as a six-lane road to ease congestion in the St Augustine area.
 State Road 315
 State Road 317
 State Road 319
 State Road 325
 State Road 329
 State Road 329A
 State Road 329B
 State Road 334
 State Road 334A
 State Road 335
 State Road 337
 State Road 338
 State Road 339
 State Road 340
 State Road 340A
 State Road 341
 State Road 341A
 State Road 342
 State Road 344
 State Road 346
 State Road 346A
 State Road 351
 State Road 352
 State Road 353
 State Road 356
 State Road 357
 State Road 358
 State Road 359
 State Road 359A
 State Road 359B
 State Road 361
 State Road 361A
 State Road 361B
 State Road 365
 State Road 367
 State Road 367A
 State Road 370
 State Road 372A
 State Road 372B
 State Road 374
 State Road 376
 State Road 379
 State Road 379A
 State Road 379B
 State Road 381
 State Road 381A
 State Road 382
 State Road 384
 State Road 384A
 State Road 385
 State Road 386
 State Road 386A
 State Road 387
 State Road 388
 State Road 389A
 State Road 390A
 State Road 392
 State Road 392A
 State Road 392B
 State Road 394
 State Road 396
 State Road 396A
 State Road 398
 State Road 398A

401–500
 State Road 402 (now County Road 402) – Max Brewer Memorial Parkway, a primary access road for Merritt Island National Wildlife Refuge and Canaveral National Seashore near Titusville
 State Road 406A – a  street connecting SR 405 and SR 406 in Titusville
 State Road 420
 State Road 424A
 State Road 425
 State Road 427
 State Road 428
 State Road 431
 State Road 436A
 State Road 437
 State Road 437A
 State Road 439
 State Road 443
 State Road 445
 State Road 448
 State Road 453
 State Road 470
 State Road 475
 State Road 476
 State Road 476A
 State Road 480
 State Road 481
 State Road 484
 State Road 485
 State Road 485A
 State Road 485B
 State Road 486
 State Road 488
 State Road 489
 State Road 490
 State Road 490A
 State Road 491
 State Road 491A
 State Road 493
 State Road 494
 State Road 495
 State Road 498

501–600
 State Road 501A  - Dixon Blvd between Clearlake Road (SR501) and US 1 in Cocoa
 State Road 502 – Barnes Boulevard in Rockledge
 State Road 503
 State Road 505 (now County Road 615) – 66th Avenue between Wabasso Road (CR 510) near Sebastian and Osceola Boulevard (SR 60) near Vero Beach
 State Road 505A (now County Road 613) – Kings Highway/58th Avenue between Wabasso Road (CR 510) in Wabasso and Oslo Road (former State Road and current County Road 606) near Vero Beach
 State Road 506
 State Road 509 (now part of County Road 509) – Minton Road in West Melbourne
 State Road 511 (now part of County Road 511) – John Rodes Boulevard in West Melbourne between US 192 and SR 518
 State Road 512 (now County Road 512) – Fellsmere Road from SR 60 in Saint Johns Marsh to US 1 (SR 5) in Sebastian
 State Road 514 (now part of County Road 514) – Malabar Road east of Interstate 95 (SR 9) in Palm Bay and Malabar
 State Road 515 (now County Road 515) – "The Scenic Trail" along the Indian River in Cocoa and Rockledge
 State Road 516
 State Road 520A – Lake Poinsett Road, a spur of SR 520 near Cocoa
 State Road 527A
 State Road 528A
 State Road 529
 State Road 532
 State Road 537
 State Road 541
 State Road 545
 State Road 545A
 State Road 550
 State Road 571
 State Road 572
 State Road 574A
 State Road 574B
 State Road 576
 State Road 577
 State Road 578
 State Road 581A
 State Road 582A- Now C.R. 582A on Fletcher Avenue east of Nebraska Avenue in Tampa. See SR 579
 State Road 582B– Now under county control on N. 50th St. between Fowler Ave ( SR 582) and Fletcher Avenue in Tampa
 State Road 583A
 State Road 584
 State Road 585 Replaced by the I-4/Selmon Expressway Connector to the east, the former state road is now locally maintained by the City of Tampa.
 State Road 585A
 State Road 587
 State Road 587A
 State Road 593
 State Road 598

601–700
 State Road 603 (now part of County Road 603) – Johnston Road between Indrio Road (SR 614) and the Indian County boundary near Lakewood Park
 State Road 605 – stretches of Old Dixie Highway in Indian River and St. Lucie counties between Wabasso and Fort Pierce
 State Road 606 – Oslo Road east of the former SR 505 near Vero Beach
 State Road 607A – Angle Road in Fort Pierce
 State Road 609 (now County Road 609) – Hale Dairy Road between the Glades Cut-off (former SR 709) and Bee Line Highway (SR 710) near Indiantown
 State Road 609 – Header Canal Road between Okeechobee Road (SR 70) and Orange Avenue (SR 68) near Fort Pierce
 State Road 609A – Shinn Road between Okeechobee Road (SR 70) and Orange Avenue (SR 68) near Fort Pierce
 State Road 611 had various alignments near and in Fort Pierce, most incorporating Jenkins Road and Edwards Road
 State Road 611A – Juanita Avenue between North 16th Street and US 1 in Fort Pierce
 State Road 611B (now part of County Road 611) – Selvitz Road north of Port St. Lucie and Edwards Boulevard in Fort Pierce
 State Road 612 (now County Road 612) – Glendale Avenue in Vero Beach
 State Road 613 (now County Road 613) – Sneed Road and Carlton Road in southwestern St. Lucie County
 State Road 617 (now part of County Road 614) – Indrio Road between SR 713 and US 1 near Lakewood Park
 State Road 619
 State Road 620
 State Road 621
 State Road 623
 State Road 627
 State Road 630 – 41st Street between CR 613 (former SR 505A) and CR 605 (former SR 605) in Vero Beach
 |State Road 632 – South Winter Beach Road near Winter Beach
 State Road 634
 State Road 634A
 State Road 635
 State Road 636 (current one former SR 64A)
 State Road 640
 State Road 652
 State Road 660
 State Road 661
 State Road 661A
 State Road 663
 State Road 663A
 State Road 664
 State Road 664A
 State Road 664B
 State Road 665
 State Road 667
 State Road 668
 State Road 671
 State Road 676A
 State Road 685A
 State Road 700A – Durance Road, a spur from US 98 (SR 700) near Basinger

701–800
 State Road 702 (now County Road 702) – 45th Street in West Palm Beach and Mangonia Park between Florida's Turnpike and US 1
 State Road 703
 State Road 704A (now County Road 704A) – Australian Avenue between Southern Boulevard (US 98-SR 80) and Okeechobee Boulevard (SR 704) in West Palm Beach
 State Road 705
 State Road 707A (now County Road 732) – Jensen Beach Boulevard in West Jensen
 State Road 708 (now County Road 708) – Bridge Road from SR 76 to US 1 near Hobe Sound
 State Road 709 (now County Road 709) – the Glades Cut-off between Port Saint Lucie and Bluefield
 State Road 712 (now County Road 712) – Midway Road (also known as White City Road) from SR 70 near Fort Pierce to CR 707 near Eldred
 State Road 712A
 State Road 712B
 State Road 719
 State Road 720 (now County Road 720) – from US 27 near Moore Haven to US 27/SR 80 near Shawnee

 State Road 721 (now County Road 721) – from SR 78 near Lakeport, through the Brighton Indian Reservation, to US 98 near Cornwell. A spur in the reservation was signed State Road 721A.
 State Road 722
 State Road 723 (now County Road 723) – Savannah Road in Jensen Beach
 State Road 724 (now County Road 724) – Peavine Trail north of Basinger and Eagle Island Road west of US 441/SR 15. The eastern terminus was just south of Fort Drum.
 State Road 731 (now County Road 731) – from County Road 74 to County Road 17 near Venus
 State Road 733
 State Road 735
 State Road 739A
 State Road 739B
 State Road 743
 State Road 744
 State Road 746
 State Road 747
 State Road 749
 State Road 751
 State Road 757
 State Road 760
 State Road 760A
 State Road 761
 State Road 762
 State Road 763
 State Road 764
 State Road 765 (now County Road 765) – from SR 78 near Fort Myers to US 41 (Tamiami Trail) near South Punta Gorda
 State Road 765A
 State Road 767 (now County Road 767) – Stringfellow Road from Saint James City to Bokeelia on Pine Island near Cape Coral
 State Road 768
 State Road 769
 State Road 771 (now County Road 771) – from Boca Grande on Gasparilla Island to SR 776 near El Jobean, crossing Gasparilla Sound via the toll Gasparilla Bridge.
 State Road 773 (now County Road 773) – from Fruitville Road (SR 780) in Sarasota to US 41 (Tamiami Trail) near Coral Cove
 State Road 775 (now County Road 775) – from County Road 771 near Placida to US 41 (Tamiami Trail) near Venice. After the SR 775 signs received the "S-" designation, much of the route became the westernmost third of SR 776.
 State Road 776A
 State Road 778
 State Road 782 (now County Road 782) – Linton Boulevard in Delray Beach
 State Road 785
 State Road 787
 State Road 798 (now County Road 798) – Palmetto Park Road in Boca Raton

801–900
 State Road 809A
 State Road 811A (now County Road 811A) – from Sunrise Boulevard (SR 838) in Fort Lauderdale to Atlantic Boulevard (SR 814) in Pompano Beach
 State Road 812 (now County Road 812) – Lantana Road from US 441-SR 7 to US 1 near Lantana
 State Road 815
 State Road 819
 State Road 824A
 State Road 827
 State Road 828
 State Road 830
 State Road 830A
 State Road 832 (now County Road 832) – from SR 29 near Felda to County Road 833
 State Road 833 (now County Road 833) – from Interstate 75 (Alligator Alley) in the Miccosukee Indian Reservation, through the Big Cypress Indian Reservation to SR 80 east of Goodno
 State Road 835
 State Road 837
 State Road 839
 State Road 840 - now County Road 840
 State Road 841
 State Road 846 (now County Road 846) – from US 41 (Tamiami Trail) in Naples Park to County Road 833 east of  Immokalee
 State Road 848
 State Road 850 (now Lee and Collier County Road 850) – from Corkscrew to SR 82 northwest of Immokalee
 State Road 850 - Northlake Boulevard from SR 811 to US 1. Decommissioned in 2018 in exchange for a county maintained segment of SR 7.
 State Road 851
 State Road 854 (now County Road 854) – from State Road 823 to US 1
 State Road 858 (now County Road 858) – loop from County Road 846 through Big Cypress Swamp to Sunnyland Station.
 State Road 862
 State Road 864
 State Road 867A - now County Road 867A
 State Road 869 (now County Road 869) – Summerlin Road from Truckland to Fort Myers
 State Road 872
 State Road 881
 State Road 886 (now County Road 886) – from US 41 (Tamiami Trail) near North Naples to County Road 951 near Golden Gate
 State Road 887 - now County Road 887, Florida State Road 887 is now a designation for the Port Miami Tunnel.
 State Road 888 (now County Road 888) – from County Road 901 to US 41
 State Road 890
 State Road 892
 State Road 894
 State Road 896
 State Road 898

901–1000
 State Road 901 (now Lee / Collier County Road 901) – from SR 865 at Bonita Springs to County Road 862 in Naples
 State Road 905 (now County Road 905): a spur from US 1 from Key Largo to the Ocean Reef Club near Grayvik in the northern tip of Largo Key. The southern half of CR 905 was part of the Overseas Highway from 1938 until 1944 (when a fire damaged Card Sound Bridge). Old "State Road S-905" signs are still posted on the edge of the road.

 State Road 905A (now County Road 905A) is the Card Sound Bridge and Card Sound Road between the bridge and CR 905 (SR 905A used to extend northward to an intersection with US 1 near Florida City, but Miami-Dade County doesn't sign its county roads and rarely designates them as "County Road ###"). As late as 2005, an old "State Road S-905A" was still posted near the intersection with CR 905.
 State Road 906
 State Road 908
 State Road 912
 State Road 917
 State Road 919
 State Road 929
 State Road 930
 State Road 931 (now County Road 931): a loop south of US 1 in Marathon on Boot Key and Vaca Key.
 State Road 936

 State Road 939 (now County Road 939): locally known as Sugarloaf Boulevard and Old State Road, CR 939 forms a loop south of US 1 on Sugarloaf Key. The western terminus is in Perky; the road follows the contour of the island as it turns around Upper Sugarloaf Sound.

 State Road 939A is a spur south of US 1 from Lower Sugarloaf Key, traveling southeast on the island as Sugarloaf Boulevard to end at old SR 4A and SR 939B. The "SR 939A" symbol still exists on modern maps.

 State Road 939B is a spur south of US 1 from Sugarloaf Key, traveling south through Pirate's Cove and west on the island to end at old SR 4A and SR 939B.  The "SR 939B" symbol still exists on modern maps.
 State Road 940 (northern segment now County Road 940): Big Pine Avenue and Elma Avenue on Big Pine Key. This is the only state road – current or former – that has segments on both sides of the Overseas Highway. A street extending eastward from Big Pine Avenue onto No Name Key is locally known as SR 4A (see "State Road 5", above). Much of Big Pine Avenue is located in National Key Deer Refuge.
 State Road 941 (now County Road 941): a spur south of US 1 from Big Coppitt Key and El Chico, travelling southwest on Bird Key and Geiger Key to end at the Key West Naval Air Station on Boca Chica Key.
 State Road 942 signs have been placed on at least two streets at different times. Both were spurs southward from US 1:
 Maloney Avenue (now not state- or county-designated) on Stock Island. The northern end is near Florida Keys Community College.
 Shore Drive (now County Road 942) on Summerland Key.
 State Road 945 
 State Road 945A
 State Road 952
 State Road 954
 State Road 955
 State Road 956
 State Road 974

1001–9999
 State Road 4081
 State Road 5098
 State Road 9823

See also

References

External links
 

Former State Roads